Emory may refer to:

Places
 Emory, Texas, U.S.
 Emory (crater), on the moon
 Emory Peak, in Texas, U.S.
 Emory River, in Tennessee, U.S.

Education
 Emory and Henry College, or simply Emory, in Emory, Virginia, U.S.
 Emory University, in Atlanta, Georgia, U.S.

Other uses
 Emory (name), a given name and surname, including a list of people and fictional characters with the name
 Emory Marketing Institute, an American non-profit innovation research group

See also

 Emery (disambiguation)
 Emory Creek Provincial Park, in British Columbia, Canada
 Emory and Henry College Hospital
 Quercus emoryi, or Emory oak
 Carex emoryi, or Emory's sedge
 , a United States Navy submarine tender